The Spanish national quidditch team is a team created with Spanish quidditch players. Since 2015 it has represented Association Quidditch Spain in the different national team tournaments organized by the IQA.

The team played for the first time in July 2015 in the European Games of Sarteano, Italy.

History

Origins 
In 2015, with the Association Quidditch Spain recently created and with the announcement of the celebration of the first European Games, the first Spanish national team to take part in this competition was created.

2015 European Games 
The Spanish Inquiddsition in this competition was unsuccessful. The bets were not in favour of the team, but they had a better than expected performance. They played in the group B beside Belgium, Catalonia, France, Poland and Turkey. They ranked ninth in the championship, without qualifying for the quarter-finals, and winning only in the inaugural game against Poland.

2016 World Cup 
On March 29, 2016, the Asociación Quidditch España published the roster for the Spanish national team for the 2016 IQA World Cup. On June 25, 2016, the IQA released the pool play draw, where Team Spain was assigned to pool C with United Kingdom, Turkey, South Korea and Austria.

Players

2018 IQA World Cup roster

2016 IQA World Cup roster

2015 IQA European Games roster

Scores

Last games

Statistics 
Legend: Pl: Played games; W: Won games; L: Games lost; QPD: Quaffle Point Difference; SWIM: Snitch When It Matters.

IQA World Cup

European Games

See also

 Spanish Quidditch Cup

References 

Quidditch national teams
quidditch
Sports clubs established in 2015